Selçuk Keskin (born January 15, 1982) is a Turkish volleyball player. He is 193 cm. He studied at Gazi University.

Career
He plays for Arkas Spor Izmir Team since 2006-07 season and wears the number 1 jersey. He played 96 times for the national team. He also played for Çankaya Belediyesi, Galatasaray, Polis Akademisi and Kolej.

References

External links
Player profile at Galatasaray.org
Player profile at Volleybox.net
Player profile at arkasspor.com

1982 births
Living people
Turkish men's volleyball players
Galatasaray S.K. (men's volleyball) players
Arkas Spor volleyball players
Polis Akademisi volleyballers
Çankaya Belediyesi volleyballers
İstanbul Büyükşehir Belediyespor volleyballers
Fenerbahçe volleyballers
Halkbank volleyball players
Ziraat Bankası volleyball players
Gazi University alumni
Volleyball players at the 2015 European Games
European Games competitors for Turkey